ACM Transactions on Computer-Human Interaction is a peer-reviewed scientific journal covering research on human–computer interaction. It was established in 1994 and is published by the Association for Computing Machinery.

Editors-in-chief 
The following persons have been editors-in-chief of the journal:
Ken Hinckley, Microsoft Research (2016–present)
Shumin Zhai, IBM Almaden Research Center (2009–2015)
John M. Carroll (2003–2009)
Jonathan Grudin (1997–2003)
Dan R. Olsen, Jr. (1994–1997)

External links

Human–computer interaction journals
Transactions on Computer-Human Interaction
Quarterly journals
English-language journals
Publications established in 1994